Italy participated at the 2010 Winter Olympics in Vancouver, British Columbia, Canada.

Medalists

Alpine skiing

Men

Women

Biathlon

Men

Women

Bobsleigh

Cross-country skiing

Men

Women

Figure skating

Italy has qualified 2 entrants in men's singles, 1 in ladies singles, 1 in pair skating, and 2 in ice dancing, for a total of 9 athletes.

Freestyle skiing

Moguls

Luge

Nordic combined 

Team large hill/4 x 5 km

Short track speed skating 

Italy's team consisted of ten athletes. Roberto Serra was scheduled to compete in the men's 5000 relay event and did not do so.

Men

Women

* Competed in final only.

Skeleton

Ski jumping 

Men

Snowboarding 

Halfpipe

Parallel GS

Snowboard cross

Speed skating 

Men

Women

Team pursuit

See also
 Italy at the 2010 Winter Paralympics

References

Winter Olympics
Nations at the 2010 Winter Olympics
2010